Inside Out is an album by multi-instrumentalist and composer Joe McPhee with violinist David Prentice, recorded in 1996 and released on the CIMP label.

Reception

AllMusic reviewer Thom Jurek states: "Of all the Joe McPhee duet recordings, this one is by far the most visionary, moving, and inspired musically and spiritually. ...there is sense about these pieces that the nature of freely improvised music is a process of unfolding oneself -- making oneself available not only to the spirit of the music, but also completely open to the other".

Track listing 
All compositions by Joe McPhee
 "Haiku Part 1: Dawn" - 3:07
 "Haiku Part 2: The Centipede" - 3:36
 "Haiku Part 3: The Edge of Wetness" - 4:21
 "It Sings" - 5:29
 "The Garden: Part 1" - 3:02
 "The Garden: Part 2" - 2:28
 "The Garden: Part 3" - 4:40
 "Conference With the Birds: Part 1" - 5:15
 "Conference With the Birds: Part 2" - 6:07
 "Dusk" - 8:20
 "Drops" - 9:53

Personnel 
Joe McPhee - trumpet, tenor saxophone, alto saxophone, soprano saxophone, gong
David Prentice - violin, Jew's harp

References 

Joe McPhee albums
1996 albums
CIMP albums